The 2004–05 Taça de Portugal was the 65th edition of the Portuguese football knockout tournament, organized by the Portuguese Football Federation (FPF). The 2004–05 Taça de Portugal began on 5 September 2004. The final was played on 29 May 2005 at the Estádio Nacional.

Benfica were the previous holders, having defeated Porto 2–1  in the previous season's final. Vitória de Setúbal defeated holders Benfica, 2–1 in the final to win their third Taça de Portugal. 
Vitória by winning the Taça de Portugal, qualified for the 2005–06 UEFA Cup first round. Vitória de Setúbal would also qualify for the 2005 Supertaça Cândido de Oliveira.

Format and schedule

1.  One hundred and six of the one hundred and eight teams competing in the 2004–05 Terceira Divisão, played in this round. Benfica B were unable to compete in the domestic cup competition due to the possibility of encountering their senior side in the competition. Queluz also did not participate.
2.  Fifty six of the fifty nine teams competing in the 2004–05 Segunda Divisão, played in this round. Braga B, Marítimo B and Porto B were unable to compete in the domestic cup competition due to the possibility of encountering their senior side in the competition.

Teams

Primeira Liga

 Académica de Coimbra
 Benfica
 Beira-Mar
 Belenenses
 Boavista
 Braga
 Estoril
 Gil Vicente
 Marítimo

 Moreirense
 Nacional
 Penafiel
 Porto
 Rio Ave
 Sporting CP
 União de Leiria
 Vitória de Guimarães
 Vitória de Setúbal

Liga de Honra

 Alverca
 Chaves
 Desportivo das Aves
 Estrela da Amadora
 Feirense
 Felgueiras
 Gondomar
 Leixões
 Maia

 Marco
 Naval
 Olhanense
 Ovarense
 Paços de Ferreira
 Portimonense
 Santa Clara
 Sporting de Espinho
 Varzim

Second Division
North Zone

 Dragões Sandinenses
 Fafe
 Fiães
 Freamunde
 Infesta
 Lixa
 Lousada
 Paredes
 Pedras Rubras

 Ribeirão
 Salgueiros
 Trofense
 União de Lamas
 Valdevez
 Valenciano
 Vilanovense
 Vilaverdense
 Vizela

Central Zone

 Abrantes
 Académico de Viseu
 Benfica Castelo Branco
 Caldas
 Esmoriz
 Estarreja
 Fátima
 Mafra
 Oliveira do Bairro
 Oliveira do Hospital

 Oliveirense
 Pampilhosa
 Penalva do Castelo
 Sanjoanense
 Sporting da Covilhã
 Sporting de Pombal
 Torreense
 Tourizense
 Vilafranquense

South Zone

 Amora
 Atlético CP
 Barreirense 
 Camacha
 Casa Pia
 Estrela Vendas Novas
 Louletano
 Lusitânia
 Odivelas
 Olivais e Moscavide

 Operário
 Oriental
 Pinhalnovense
 Pontassolense
 Portosantense
 Ribeira Brava
 União da Madeira
 União Micaelense
 Vasco Gama AC

Third Division
Série A

 AD Oliveirense
 Bragança
 Cabeceirense
 Caçadores das Taipas
 Cerveira
 Dragões Sandinenses
 Esposende
 Joane
 Maria da Fonte

 Merelinense
 Mirandela
 Monção
 Neves
 Ponte da Barca
 Santa Maria
 União Torcatense
 Valpaços
 Vianense

Série B

 Aliados Lordelo
 Canedo
 Canelas
 Cinfães
 Ermesinde
 Famalicão
 Leça
 Mogadourense
 Padroense

 Pedrouços
 Rebordosa
 Rio Tinto
 Santa Marta de Penaguião
 São Pedro da Cova
 Tirsense
 Torre de Moncorvo
 UD Valonguense
 Vila Real

Série C

 Águeda
 Anadia
 Arrifanense
 Avanca
 Castro Daire
 Cesarense
 Gafanha
 Milheiroense
 Nelas

 Poiares
 Santacombadense
 São João de Ver
 Sátão
 Social Lamas
 Souropires
 Tocha
 União de Coimbra
 Valecambrense

Série D

 Águias do Moradal
 Atlético Riachense
 Beneditense
 Bidoeirense
 Caranguejeira
 Eléctrico
 Idanhense
 Marinhense
 Mirandense

 Monsanto
 Nazarenos
 Peniche
 Portomosense
 Rio Maior
 Sertanense
 Sourense
 Torres Novas
 Vieirense

Série E

 1º de Dezembro
 Atlético do Cacém
 Câmara de Lobos
 Cartaxo
 Carregado
 Estrela da Calheta
 Fazendense
 Loures

 Lourinhanense
 Machico
 Malveira
 O Elvas
 Santana
 Sintrense
 União de Tires
 Vialonga

Série F

 Aljustrelense
 Almada
 Almancilense
 Beira-Mar de Monte Gordo
 Desportivo de Beja
 Farense
 Imortal
 Juventude de Évora
 Lagoa

 Lusitano de Évora
 Lusitano VRSA
 Messinense
 Moura
 Montijo
 Sesimbra
 Seixal
 Silves
 União Santiago

Série Azores

 Angrense
 Boavista Flores
 Capelense
 Madalena
 Minhocas

 Os Leões
 Praiense
 Santiago
 Santo António
 Velense

District Leagues

 Alvarães
 Amarante
 Boavista Ribeirinha
 Cerva
 Ericeirense
 Fayal
 Gouveia
 Guia
 Lourinhanense
 Macedo de Cavaleiros
 Marialvas

 Nisa e Benfica
 Oleiros
 Palmelense
 Rabo Peixe
 São Vicente
 Sporting de Cuba
 Terras de Bouro
 Tondela
 União da Serra
 União Figueirense
 União Montemor

First round
For the first round draw, teams were drawn against each other in accordance to their geographical location. The draw was split up into four sections: teams from the north, the center, the south and the Azores region. All first round cup ties were played on the 5–15 September. Due to the odd number of teams at this stage of the competition, Angrense progressed to the next round due to having no opponent to face at this stage of the competition. The first round of the cup saw teams from the Terceira Divisão (IV) start the competition alongside some teams who registered to participate in the cup from the Portuguese District Leagues (V).

North Zone

|}

Central Zone

|}

South Zone

|}

Azores Zone

|}

Second round
Ties were played between the 19 September and 5 October. The second round saw teams from the Portuguese Second Division (III) enter the competition.

|}

Third round
The draw for the third round took place on the 24 September. Ties were played on the 5–13 October.  Due to the odd number of teams at this stage of the competition, Marco progressed to the next round due to having no opponent to face at this stage of the competition. The third round saw teams from the Liga de Honra (II) enter the competition.

|}

Fourth round
The draw for the fourth round took place on the 11 October. All fourth round cup ties were played on the 26–27 October. Due to the odd number of teams at this stage of the competition, Belenenses progressed to the next round due to having no opponent to face at this stage of the competition. The fourth round saw teams from the Primeira Liga (I) enter the competition.

|}

Fifth round
Ties were played on the 21–23 December and 4–12 January.

Sixth round
Ties were played on the 25–26 January. Due to the odd number of participants involved in the 2004–05 Taça de Portugal, Beira-Mar qualified for the quarter finals due to having no opponent to face at this stage of the competition.

Quarter-finals
All quarter-final ties were played on the 2–3 March.

Semi-finals
Ties were played on the 19–20 April.

Final

References

Taça de Portugal seasons
Taca De Portugal, 2004-05
2004–05 domestic association football cups